Mikhail Yakovlevich Herzenstein (Voznesensk, Russian Empire — , Terijoki, Grand Duchy of Finland, Russian Empire) was a Russian-Jewish scientist and politician who converted to Christianity, elected for the Constitutional Democratic Party to the First State Duma of the Russian Empire, representing the city of Moscow. He was assassinated before the end of his parliamentary mandate by the Black Hundreds, a reactionary antisemitic terrorist group at his summer home in Terijoki in the Grand Duchy of Finland.

See also 
 :ru:Иоллос, Григорий Борисович

Footnotes

References 
 
 — P. 136

1859 births
1906 deaths
People from Voznesensk
People from Yelisavetgradsky Uyezd
Ukrainian Jews
Converts to Eastern Orthodoxy from Judaism
Russian Constitutional Democratic Party members
Members of the 1st State Duma of the Russian Empire
Russian Christians
Economists from the Russian Empire
Odesa University alumni
Antisemitism in the Russian Empire
Antisemitic attacks and incidents in Europe
Assassinated politicians of the Russian Empire
Assassinated Jews